The Downing Site is a major site of the University of Cambridge, located in the centre of the city of Cambridge, England, on Downing Street and Tennis Court Road, adjacent to Downing College. The Downing Site is the larger and newer of two city-centre science sites of the university (the other being the New Museums Site).  Largely populated with utilitarian brick buildings dating from the 1930s, the more notable buildings include the Zoology Laboratory (1900–04), Sedgwick Museum of Earth Sciences (1904–11) and Downing Street entrance (1904–11).

To the northwest is the New Museums Site and to the southwest is the Old Addenbrooke's Site, two other important University of Cambridge sites.

History
The current site was part of Pembroke Leys, a boggy area of small fields lying between Regent Street and Tennis Court Road, to the south of the medieval town of Cambridge.  The Pembroke Leys was acquired by Downing College on its foundation, but the northern portion of the Leys remained undeveloped.  This northern portion was purchased by the university in 1895 for £15,000, and now forms the Downing Site.

University departments and institutions
Though several university departments have recently relocated to larger modern buildings elsewhere, the Downing Site still houses many departments, predominantly in the biomedical sciences. These include:

Department of Biochemistry (old site)
Department of Earth Sciences
Department of Psychology
Department of Genetics
Department of Geography
Department of Pathology
Department of Physiology, Development and Neuroscience
Department of Plant Sciences (formerly Botany)
Department of Veterinary Anatomy
Department of Archaeology and Anthropology
McDonald Institute for Archaeological Research
Molteno Laboratory (Parasitology)
Museum of Archaeology and Anthropology
Physiological Laboratory
Sedgwick Museum of Earth Sciences
Zoology Laboratory

References

External links
Map of Downing Site
Cambridge 2000 project
Janus entry

University of Cambridge sites
Downing College, Cambridge